rec.music.hip-hop (commonly referred to as RMHH) is an Internet Usenet newsgroup primarily dedicated to the discussion of rap and hip-hop music. RMHH is one of the longest running newsgroups on Usenet for the discussion of rap and hip-hop, established in 1995.

Group history 
The newsgroup was proposed and chartered by Steve "Flash" Juon in 1994 as an effort to expand the discussion of rap and hip-hop music on Usenet. Two newsgroups, alt.rap and rec.music.funky, already existed for the discussion of rap and hip-hop music. However, it was noted that the alt.rap group was not as widely distributed due to Usenet servers not carrying all (or any) of the alt hierarchy, and the discussion in rec.music.funky was mainly centered around funk music. Juon and others felt that both groups would be better served by moving discussion to the more high-profile, high-distributed rec.music sub-hierarchy.

Group charter 
The proposed finalized charter for the rec.music.hip-hop: 
This newsgroup is to provide a forum for the discussion and dissemination of information specifically relating to hip-hop music and culture.  This group is meant to replace the newsgroup alt.rap for a multitude of reasons, stated herein.

One: Members of the rec.music.funky included rap as a form of 'funky' music in their charter, yet they seem not to desire the volume of traffic rap music generates.  Some hold the opinion that the newsgroup should deal with funk music alone, and that the large amount of rap traffic be directed elsewhere.  Those who post to rec.music.funky say they have nowhere else to go, often because their feed does not carry the alt hierarchy.

Two: By moving to the rec.music hierarchy, we formally establish that rap IS indeed a form of music.  Periodically the alt newsgroup receives flames claiming the contrary, yet forms of music which rap evolved from have their own newsgroups (rec.music.bluenote and rec.music.reggae are two examples).

Three: The rec hierarchy is carried by more feeds than is the alt hierarchy. By moving to the rec hierarchy we hope to increase the amount of coverage and traffic our newsgroup receives.

Passage & creation of RMHH 

The first  CfV (Call for Votes) was issued on January 6, 1995, with all votes needing to be cast by January 26, 1995 at 23:59:59 UTC. The final votes were officially posted on February 2, 1995, and the proposal to create rec.music.hip-hop passed with 239 YES votes, 44 NO votes, 3 ABSTAIN votes and 3 INVALID votes. 

The first post to the newsgroup was made by Steve Juon on February 3, 1995, a first draft of the rec.music.hip-hop FAQ.

Impact on the Usenet community 

With the successful proposal and creation of RMHH, subscribers to the alt.rap newsgroup were encouraged to discontinue their participation in alt.rap. Subsequently, traffic to the alt.rap newsgroup fell by nearly 79% within the first two months of RMHH's establishment. Although the total number of posts to the alt.rap newsgroup did recover for a few years, participation in this group was only a fraction compared to RMHH. The rec.music.funky newsgroups saw a gradual decline in discussion of rap & hip-hop music, with most of the discussion completely gone within a one-year period.

Current information 

According to Google Groups, as of May 26, 2008 the newsgroup has 116,074 posts , and is categorized as a "High Activity" newsgroup. The most messages the newsgroup received was 8030 in June 2003.. Although expansion of the World Wide Web has seen a general decline in Usenet discussion over the years, the newsgroup still receives over 1300 messages a month.

Website 
 

The RMHH newsgroup established an official website for itself, rmhh.com, in 1998. Originally managed by RMHH contributor Dee Phunk, hosting and updates were transferred to Steve Juon in December 1999. The site was scheduled to be transferred to a new member to host and update in 2002, however the new site never materialized, and the domain name was purchased by an advertising group after it was not renewed. The current RMHH Official Website is hosted by BeDoper.com and is managed by contributing members The Ranger, Sumran Choudrey and High-C.

External links 
RMHH Official Website
Internet Archive for rmhh.com
Google Groups archive for rec.music.hip-hop

Newsgroups